Sonqorabad (also Romanized as Sonqorābād) is a village in Bala Velayat Rural District, Bala Velayat District, Bakharz County, Razavi Khorasan Province, Iran. At the 2006 census, its population was 988, in 196 families.

References 

Populated places in Bakharz County